Eric II, Duke of Mecklenburg (3 September 1483 – 21/22 December 1508) was Duke of Mecklenburg, a son of Magnus II, Duke of Mecklenburg, and his wife Sophie of Pomerania-Stettin.

Eric ruled Mecklenburg-Schwerin jointly with his brothers Henry V and Albert VII and his uncle Balthasar after his father's death on 27 December 1503.  Eric himself probably died on 21 December or 22 December 1508. He was buried in the Doberan Minster in Bad Doberan. He never married and died childless.

House of Mecklenburg
1483 births
1508 deaths
Dukes of Mecklenburg-Schwerin